Ocinara abbreviata is a moth in the family Bombycidae. It was described by Wolfgang Dierl in 1978. It is found on the Philippines and Sulawesi.

The wingspan is 17–28 mm. Adults are highly variable, ranging in colour from straw yellow, reddish brown, greyish brown, violet grey to brown.

References

Bombycidae
Moths described in 1978